Harold Dudley Hay (31 December 1881 – 27 December 1955) was an Australian rules footballer who played for the Melbourne Football Club in the Victorian Football League (VFL).

Family
His brother, Cedric Rupert Hay (1880–1953), also played VFL football for Melbourne.

Football

Melbourne (VFL)
Hay became one of the club's first premiership players, playing in the 1900 VFL Grand Final, under the captaincy of Dick Wardill. He made his debut against  in Round 13 of the 1900 VFL season, at the Melbourne Cricket Ground.

"Heritage number"
Hay has been given the Melbourne Heritage Number of 81 (his brother, Ced, has 82), based on the order of his debut for the club.

Death
Hay died at his home, the Langi Oonah homestead, in Barooga, New South Wales, just across the Murray River from Cobram, on 27 December 1955.

Footnotes

References

External links
 
 
 Harold Hay, at Demonwiki.

1881 births
Melbourne Football Club players
Australian rules footballers from Melbourne
1955 deaths
Melbourne Football Club Premiership players
One-time VFL/AFL Premiership players
People from St Kilda, Victoria